Mikhail Devyatyarov Jr. (born 11 November 1985 in Chusovoy, Perm Krai) is a Russian cross-country skier who competed between 2003 and 2017. At the 2010 Winter Olympics in Vancouver, he finished eighth in the individual sprint event.

Devyatyarov also finished 15th in the individual sprint at the FIS Nordic World Ski Championships 2007 in Sapporo.

His lone world cup victory was in a sprint event at Stockholm in 2007.

He is the son of Mikhail Devyatyarov, who competed for the Soviet Union and Russia from 1982 to 1992, winning gold in the 15 km event at the 1988 Winter Olympics in Calgary.

Cross-country skiing results
All results are sourced from the International Ski Federation (FIS).

Olympic Games

World Championships

World Cup

Season standings

Individual podiums
1 victory 
1 podium

Team podiums

1 victory 
1 podium

References

External links

1985 births
Living people
People from Chusovoy
Cross-country skiers at the 2010 Winter Olympics
Olympic cross-country skiers of Russia
Russian male cross-country skiers
Sportspeople from Perm Krai